Jim Patterson Stadium is a baseball stadium in Louisville, Kentucky.  It is the home field of the University of Louisville Cardinals college baseball team. It hosted the 2007 NCAA Super Regionals, where the Cardinals defeated Oklahoma State two games to one to advance to the College World Series in Omaha, Nebraska. Since then, the Cardinals have hosted an NCAA Division I Baseball Championship every year since the year of 2012. In 2016, the Cardinals ranked 27th among Division I baseball programs in attendance, averaging 2,606 per home game. Along with that, the Cardinals have been ranked in the top 10 amongst other collegiate baseball teams in the nation according to Baseball America. Coach Dan McDonnell has been the head coach of the Louisville Cardinals baseball team since the year of 2007 after coming from Ole Miss as an assistant coach. Since making his way to Louisville, he has led the team to four College World Series and seven NCAA Super Regionals.

History

The stadium was built on a former "brown field" site which had been abandoned for over 20 years. The site was split in half when Central Avenue was built through the area, with the original brick office building for the company remaining intact on the north side of the road and the remaining sections bulldozed. The office was refurbished and is now home to the Jewish Hospital Sports Medicine clinic, which was relocated from downtown. There is additional leasable space in the building which  features the University of Louisville Family Medicine Clinic, a 24-hour non-emergency medical clinic that is featured by the university's student health insurance. 

The project to build the stadium was simultaneous with the redevelopment of the southern half of the property on the other side of Central Avenue into a  shopping center, with a UofL themed Kroger store as its anchor. All of the site is owned by Faulkner Hinton & Associates, including the stadium itself. UofL currently holds a 99-year lease on the stadium site.

At its opening, the stadium had 1,500 chairback seats, with several knolls along the outfield wall which seat an additional 1,000 people. The stadium opened in 2005 and is named after former Louisville baseball player and founder of Long John Silver's, Jim Patterson. Patterson donated $5 million of the complex's $10 million cost.

The stadium went through a renovation in 2013 that added another 1,500 chairback seats, which brought the total capacity to 4,000.  As part of the renovations, terraces were added behind the seating areas, and the press box and visiting locker rooms were improved.

Pictures

See also
 List of NCAA Division I baseball venues
 List of attractions and events in the Louisville metropolitan area

References

College baseball venues in the United States
Louisville Cardinals baseball
Sports venues in Louisville, Kentucky
Baseball venues in Kentucky